The 2014 season was the St. Louis Rams' 77th in the National Football League, their 20th in St. Louis and their third under head coach Jeff Fisher. The Rams attempted to reach a playoff berth for the first time since their 2004 season, but were officially eliminated in their loss against Arizona in Week 15. The Rams failed to improve on their 7–9 record from 2013, finishing 6–10 in 2014. The Rams' 2014 season was notable for their numerous starting quarterbacks including Austin Davis, Shaun Hill, and Sam Bradford, the last of whom was injured before the season began. Despite the lack of stability at the position, the Rams defeated both defending conference champions, Super Bowl participants, and 2014 division winners, the Seattle Seahawks and Denver Broncos, plus also shutting out two teams in consecutive weeks: the Oakland Raiders and Washington Redskins. To date, defensive tackle Aaron Donald is the only one remaining from the 2014 St. Louis Rams squad. This also represents the most recent last-place finish in the NFC West for the St. Louis/Los Angeles Rams.

2014 draft class

Draft trades
 The Rams acquired an additional first-round selection (No. 2 overall) as part of a trade that sent the team's 2012 first-round selection (Robert Griffin III) to the Washington Redskins.
 The Rams traded their second- (No. 44 overall) and fifth- (No. 153 overall) round selections to the Buffalo Bills in exchange for the Bills' second-round selection (No. 41 overall).
 The Rams acquired an additional seventh-round selection (No. 241 overall) in a trade that sent cornerback Josh Gordy to the Indianapolis Colts.

Staff

Final roster

Schedule

Preseason
The season took a turn for the worst when starting QB Sam Bradford tore his ACL against the Cleveland Browns on August 23.  It was the same ACL he tore the year before that caused him to miss the last half of the year.

Regular season

Note: Intra-division opponents are in bold text.

Game summaries

Week 1: vs. Minnesota Vikings

The Rams started the season at home against Minnesota, their first meeting at home since week 15 two years back. The Vikings went on to stun the Rams, 36-22.

Already missing starting quarterback Sam Bradford for the year with another knee injury, the Rams lost several starters via injury; New starting quarterback Shaun Hill, to injured quadriceps, and defensive end Chris Long was hampered by an ankle injury which forced him to miss two months. An unknown, but third-string quarterback named Austin Davis, who would take the starting job for the next few games, took over for Hill in the second half. The Rams, limited by two field goals, would go on to lose their home opener, 34-6.

Week 2: at Tampa Bay Buccaneers

With Chris Long and Shaun Hill out, the Rams travel to Tampa Bay looking to rebound from the blowout home loss against Minnesota. The game saw Austin Davis get first start. Most of the game was delayed due to lightning and thunder after the game was tied to 7. Rams kicker Greg Zurelien nailed a last minute field goal to give the Rams a close 19-17 victory, giving them their first win of the season, with a record of one game tied apiece.

Week 3: vs. Dallas Cowboys

The Rams started off hot early in the game, but Dallas responded in the second half, including a Tony Romo pass to Dez Bryant for 68 yards, in which stunned the St. Louis home crowd. In the fourth quarter Rams tight end Jared Cook's temper snapped on the sidelines as he shoved quarterback Austin Davis who attempted to find Cook in the end zone, but Davis pass was incomplete. Davis threw a couple of interceptions, including one by a swarming of Dallas defenders to give Dallas a 34-31 victory.

Week 5: at Philadelphia Eagles

Week 6: vs. San Francisco 49ers

Hosting the 49ers on Monday Night, the Rams, sporting their 1999 throwbacks, welcomed back "The Greatest Show on Turf" at halftime. But the 49ers ruined their party as they would go on to stun the Rams at home 31-17.

Week 7: vs. Seattle Seahawks

Hoping to rebound from the heartbreaking Monday Night loss at home, the Rams face the defending Super Bowl champion Seahawks. Highlighted by a series of fake punts and long returns, the Rams managed to squeeze past the Super Bowl champions, 28-26.

Week 8: at Kansas City Chiefs

The Rams travel to Kansas City to face their in-state rival and the first of four AFC West opponents of the season, the Chiefs. Things would get ugly for the Rams as more injuries continue to pile up as both offensive lineman Jake Long and wide receiver Brian Quick suffered season-ending knee and shoulder injuries, respectively. With the loss, the Rams are 0-1 against AFC West opponents.

Week 9: at San Francisco 49ers

In the last seconds of the fourth quarter, Rams linebacker James Laurinaitis scooped a fumble from 49ers' quarterback Colin Kaepernick, who attempted to dive into the endzone for a game-winning touchdown, to give the Rams a 13-10 victory. The defense, for the most part, sacked Kaepernick eight times.

Week 10: at Arizona Cardinals

Week 11: vs. Denver Broncos

The Rams meet the Broncos at home for the first time since their home opener in 2006. The Rams won 18-10.

The injury-riddled Denver Broncos (7-2) travel to St. Louis, looking to extend their lead in the AFC West, but it was too late as the Rams defense harassed Peyton Manning and the Broncos offense all day long. Rams' quarterback Shaun Hill returned from injury and took over for Austin Davis, who started only a few games. Among the game's highlights was Rams safety Rodney McLeod taking a hit on Broncos' wide receiver Emmanuel Sanders, forcing Sanders to leave the game with a concussion. Officials later confirmed that the McLeod hit on Sanders was not illegal. The Rams won 22-7 and are tied one game apiece against all AFC West opponents.

Week 12: at San Diego Chargers

The Rams travel to San Diego, facing their third AFC West opponent, the Chargers. The Rams looked to go 2-1 against AFC West opponents, but couldn't flick the switch this time thanks to the Chargers' Philip Rivers' late game heroics and the defense, who intercepted a pass from Shaun Hill, who attempted a game-winning touchdown pass. With the 27-24 loss, this gave the Rams a 1-2 record against all AFC West opponents. Rams fans, who attended the game, were seen holding up signs involving a possible return to Los Angeles.

Week 13: vs. Oakland Raiders

The Rams meet the Raiders at home for the first time in twelve years after Week 6 of 2002, where the Rams defeated the Raiders, who were 4-0 at the time, 28-13 to give the Rams their first victory of 2002 after starting the year with five consecutive losses.

Before the game, five Rams receivers came out of the tunnel with their hands up in protest to support the Ferguson unrest, causing controversy (see hands up don't shoot). Amid the "Hands Up" controversy, the Rams defense obliterated the Raiders and struggling new quarterback Derek Carr all game long. The game was best highlighted by two Tre Mason touchdowns, including an 89-yard run. The Rams held the Raiders scoreless with a 52-0 blowout. With the victory, the Rams finished the year 2-2 against all AFC West opponents.

Week 14: at Washington Redskins

Despite Rams' kicker Greg Zuerlein missing a series of field goals and chants of "RG3!!!" from Washington's home crowd, the Rams still managed to hold Washington scoreless, giving them a 24-0 victory, and their sixth and final win the Rams would get this year. For the second time in a row this season, the Rams held an opponent scoreless. During the opening coin toss, the Rams sent out all 6 players acquired in the RG3 trade in 2012 as their team captains.

Week 15: vs. Arizona Cardinals

With the loss, the Rams were officially eliminated from playoff contention.

Week 16: vs. New York Giants

The Rams wrapped up their 2014 home schedule, facing their fourth and final NFC East opponent, the Giants, led by new wide receiver Odell Beckham Jr. Tempers flared later in the game as a sideline brawl escalated after a late hit on Beckham, drawing 3 ejections to Giants' Damontre Moore and Preston Parker and Rams' defensive end William Hayes. The Rams went on to lose their final home game, 27-37.

Week 17: at Seattle Seahawks

Going to Seattle for their third straight year, the Rams once again struggled all game, losing the game 20-6, ending their season with a disappointing 6-10 record. The record led the team to draft running back Todd Gurley from Georgia with the 10th pick in the first round of the 2015 NFL Draft.

Standings

Division

Conference

Awards and honors

References

External links
 

St. Louis
St. Louis Rams seasons
St. Louis Rams